Wilmington Airport can refer to:

Wilmington Airport (Delaware) in New Castle County, Delaware (Philadelphia metropolitan area)
Wilmington International Airport in Wrightsboro, North Carolina, serving the city of Wilmington, North Carolina 
Airborne Airpark in Wilmington, Ohio